Wu Shaobin (born 4 February 1969) is a Singaporean chess Grandmaster. He won the national Singaporean Chess Championship in 2003 and 2005. He is married to former Women's World Chess Champion Xie Jun.

In 1998, Wu Shaobin became China's 8th Grandmaster. He played for China in the 1994 Chess Olympiad  and for Singapore in the 2000, 2002 and 2004 Chess Olympiads. He gained the title of FIDE Trainer in 2005.

He has played for Shandong chess club in the China Chess League (CCL).

See also
Chess in China

References

External links
Wu Shaobin - New In Chess. NICBase Online.

Chessmetrics Career Ratings for Wu Shaobin
Elo rating with world rankings and historical development since 1990 (benoni.de/schach/elo) for Wu Shaobin

1969 births
Living people
Chess grandmasters
Chess Olympiad competitors
Chess players from Henan
Singaporean chess players
Singaporean sportspeople of Chinese descent
Southeast Asian Games bronze medalists for Singapore
Southeast Asian Games medalists in chess
People from Anyang
Competitors at the 2005 Southeast Asian Games
20th-century Singaporean people